Balloon Farm may refer to:

 Balloon Farm (Frankfort, New York), a historic home at Frankfort in Herkimer County, New York
 Balloon Farm (film), a 1999 TV movie
 The Balloon Farm, a musical act from New Jersey